Steven Wayne Scarsone (born April 11, 1966) is an American former professional baseball infielder and former minor league manager. He serves on the Oakland Athletics' Player Development staff as travelling minor league instructor. He played all or parts of seven seasons in Major League Baseball  (MLB) between 1992 and 1999 for the Philadelphia Phillies, Baltimore Orioles, San Francisco Giants, St. Louis Cardinals, and Kansas City Royals.

Playing career
Scarsone attended Canyon High School in his native Anaheim. He went on to attend Rancho Santiago College in Santa Ana, California.

He was drafted by the Philadelphia Phillies in the 2nd round of the 1986 MLB January Draft. His professional career began that year with the Class A (Short Season) Bend Phillies. In 1987, he played for the Class A Charleston Wheelers. His 1988 season was spent with the Class A Clearwater Phillies. In 1989, Scarsone was promoted to the Double-A Reading Phillies. He split the 1990 season between Clearwater and Reading. He played part of the 1991 season at Reading, but played the majority with the Triple-A Scranton/Wilkes-Barre Red Barons. He began the 1992 season with Scranton/Wilkes-Barre, but was called up to the Phillies where he made his major league debut on May 15. He recorded his first big league hit in the game against the Cincinnati Reds. He played in seven games before returning to Triple-A. 

Scarsone was traded to the Baltimore Orioles for Juan Bell on August 11, 1992. He played 11 games with Baltimore, but also played with their Triple-A Rochester Red Wings. On March 20, 1993, he was traded to the San Francisco Giants for Mark Leonard. Scarsone played for both San Francisco and their Triple-A Phoenix Giants that year. He spent the entire 1994 to 1996 seasons with San Francisco. In 1995, he had a .266 batting average with 11 home runs in 80 games played. Scarsone was promoted to starting early in the 1996 season but struggled at the plate; the Giants released him after the season ended.

He signed as a free agent with the St. Louis Cardinals in 1997. He appeared in five games with the major league team, but also played with the Triple-A Louisville Redbirds. He was released on May 17, and signed a minor league contract with the San Diego Padres on May 20. He played the rest of the campaign with the Triple-A Las Vegas Stars. He was granted free agency after the season, and signed with the Anaheim Angels for 1998, playing the entire year with the Triple-A Vancouver Canadians. In 1999, Scarsone signed as a free agent with the Kansas City Royals. He played 18 games with the Triple-A Omaha Golden Spikes and 46 with Kansas City, including his final major league game on September 8, 1999.

In total, Scarsone appeared in 350 major league games, making 148 appearances at second base, 86 at third base, 36 at first base, and 19 at short stop.

Managerial career
After retiring from playing, Scarsone became manager of the Arizona Diamondbacks' Class A affiliate, the South Bend Silver Hawks of the Midwest League, in 2001. He was promoted to their Class A-Advanced Lancaster JetHawks of the California League in 2002.

In 2009, he began managing in the Oakland Athletics organization. Scarsone led the Class A Kane County Cougars to win the Midwest League's first-half title. His 2010 Stockton Ports (Class A-Advanced California League) captured the second-half title. Both the Cougars and Ports lost in their league's quarterfinals. Scarsone managed the Double-A Texas League's Midland RockHounds in 2011 and 2012. With the Triple-A Pacific Coast League's Sacramento River Cats, Scarsone's teams missed the playoffs by only two game in both 2013 and 2014. From 2015 to 2016, he managed the Triple-A Nashville Sounds, who became the Athletics' Triple-A farm club in 2015. Scarsone led the 2016 Sounds to win the American Southern Division title, and he won the PCL Manager of the Year Award.

From 2017, he will serve on the A's Player Development staff as traveling minor league instructor.

References

External links

1966 births
Living people
American expatriate baseball players in Canada
Baltimore Orioles players
Baseball players from Anaheim, California
Bend Phillies players
Charleston Wheelers players
Clearwater Phillies players
Kansas City Royals players
Las Vegas Stars (baseball) players
Louisville Redbirds players
Nashville Sounds managers
Omaha Golden Spikes players
Philadelphia Phillies players
Phoenix Firebirds players
Reading Phillies players
Rochester Red Wings players
San Francisco Giants players
Santa Ana Dons baseball players
Scranton/Wilkes-Barre Red Barons players
St. Louis Cardinals players
Vancouver Canadians players